Lolita is a 1997 drama film directed by Adrian Lyne and written by Stephen Schiff. It is the second screen adaptation of Vladimir Nabokov's 1955 novel of the same name and stars Jeremy Irons as Humbert Humbert and Dominique Swain as Dolores "Lolita" Haze, with supporting roles by Melanie Griffith as Charlotte Haze, and Frank Langella as Clare Quilty. The film is about a middle-aged male professor named Humbert who rents a room in the house of the widow Charlotte Haze and becomes sexually attracted to her adolescent daughter Dolores, also called "Lo" or "Lolita".

Lyne's film is more overt with many of the novel's darker elements compared to Stanley Kubrick's 1962 version, which used suggestion and innuendo for comic purposes.

The film had difficulty finding an American distributor and premiered in Europe before being released in the United States. The film was eventually picked up in the United States by Showtime, a cable network, before finally being released theatrically by The Samuel Goldwyn Company. Although praised by some critics for its faithfulness to Nabokov's narrative and for the performances of Irons and Swain, the film received a mixed critical reception in the United States. Lolita was met with much controversy in Australia, where it was not given a theatrical release until April 1999.

Plot
In 1947, Humbert Humbert, a middle-aged European professor of English literature, travels to the United States to take a teaching position in New Hampshire. He rents a room in the home of widow Charlotte Haze, largely because he is sexually attracted to her 14-year-old daughter Dolores, also called "Lo", whom he sees while touring the house. Obsessed from boyhood with girls of approximately her age (whom he calls "nymphets"), Humbert is immediately smitten with Lo and marries Charlotte only to be near her daughter.

Charlotte finds Humbert's secret diary and discovers his preference for her daughter. Furious, Charlotte runs out of the house, when she is struck by a car and killed, with Humbert eventually telling Lo about her mother's death. Charlotte's death frees Humbert to pursue a romantic and sexual relationship with Lo, whom he nicknames "Lolita". Humbert and Lo then travel the country, staying in various motels before eventually settling in the college town of Beardsley, where Humbert takes a teaching job and Lo begins attending Beardsley Prep School, an all-girls Catholic school. Humbert must conceal the nature of his relationship with Lolita from everyone – strangers they encounter when traveling as well as the administration at Beardsley. He presents his relationship with Lo to the world as a father and daughter. Over time, Lo's increasing boredom with Humbert, combined with her growing desire for independence and realization of their relationship, fuels a constant tension that leads to a fight between them. Humbert's affection for Lo is also rivaled by another man, playwright Clare Quilty, who has been pursuing Lo since the beginning of the pair's travels. Lo eventually escapes with Quilty, and Humbert's search for them is unsuccessful, especially as he doesn't know Quilty's name.

Three years later, Humbert receives a letter from Lo asking for money. Humbert visits Lo, who is now married and pregnant. Her husband, Richard, knows nothing about her past. Humbert asks her to run away with him, but she refuses. He relents and gives her a substantial amount of money. Lo also reveals to Humbert how Quilty actually tracked young girls and took them to Pavor Manor, his home in Parkington, to exploit them for child pornography. Quilty abandoned her after she refused to be in one of his films.

After his visit with Lo, Humbert tracks down Quilty and murders him. After being chased by the police, Humbert is arrested and sent to prison. He dies in prison in November 1950 due to a coronary thrombosis, and Lo dies the next month on Christmas Day from childbirth complications.

Cast

 Jeremy Irons as Professor Humbert Humbert
 Ben Silverstone as young Humbert
 Dominique Swain as Dolores "Lolita" Haze
 Frank Langella as Clare Quilty
 Melanie Griffith as Charlotte Haze
 Suzanne Shepherd as Miss Pratt
 Keith Reddin as Reverend Rigger
 Erin J. Dean as Mona
 Joan Glover as Miss LaBone
 Ed Grady as Dr. Melinik
 Michael Goodwin as Mr. Beale
 Angela Paton as Mrs. Holmes
 Emma Griffiths-Malin as Annabel Lee
 Ronald Pickup as young Humbert's father
 Michael Culkin as Mr. Leigh
 Annabelle Apsion as Mrs. Leigh

Production
The first screen adaptation of the book, 1962's Lolita, was credited solely to Nabokov, although it was heavily revised by Stanley Kubrick and James Harris and was directed by Kubrick.

The screenplay for the 1997 version, more faithful to the text of the novel than the earlier motion picture, is credited to Stephen Schiff, a writer for The New Yorker, Vanity Fair, and other magazines. Schiff was hired to write it as his first movie script, after the film's producers had rejected commissioned screenplays from the more experienced screenwriters and directors James Dearden (Fatal Attraction), Harold Pinter, and David Mamet. According to Schiff:

Schiff added that Kubrick's film might better have been titled Quilty, since the director had 
allowed the character of Quilty to "take over the movie".

Lyne states in the DVD commentary that he prefers location shooting even though it is more difficult in some respects; and that the home of Charlotte Haze was filmed in Wilmington, North Carolina.

Release
Lolita premiered in the United States on Showtime on August 2, 1998. Due to the difficulty in securing a distributor, the film received a limited theatrical run in the US on September 25, 1998, in order to qualify for awards. Accordingly, the film took in a gross income of $19,492 in its opening weekend. Lolita grossed $1,147,784 domestically, against an estimated $62 million budget.

Reception
On review aggregator Rotten Tomatoes, the film holds an approval rating of 69% based on 26 reviews, with an average rating of 7/10. The site's critical consensus reads: "If it can't quite live up to Nabokov's words, Adrian Lyne's Lolita manages to find new emotional notes in this complicated story, thanks in large part to its solid performances." Metacritic assigned the film a weighted average score of 46 out of 100, based on 17 critics, indicating "mixed or average reviews".

James Berardinelli praised the performances of the two leads, Irons and Swain, but he considered Griffith's performance weak, "stiff and unconvincing"; he considered the film better when she no longer appeared in it and concluded: "Lolita is not a sex film; it's about characters, relationships, and the consequences of imprudent actions. And those who seek to brand the picture as immoral have missed the point. Both Humbert and Lolita are eventually destroyed—what could be more moral? The only real controversy I can see surrounding this film is why there was ever a controversy in the first place."

The film was The New York Times "Critics Pick" on July 31, 1998, with its critic Caryn James saying, "Rich beyond what anyone could have expected, the film repays repeated viewings...it turns Humbert's madness into art." Writer/director James Toback lists it in his picks for the 10 finest films ever made, but he rates the original film higher.

Commenting on differences between the novel and the film, Charles Taylor, in Salon, observes that "[f]or all of their vaunted (and, it turns out, false) fidelity to Nabokov, Lyne and Schiff have made a pretty, gauzy Lolita that replaces the book's cruelty and comedy with manufactured lyricism and mopey romanticism". Extending Taylor's observation, Keith Phipps concludes: "Lyne doesn't seem to get the novel, failing to incorporate any of Nabokov's black comedy—which is to say, Lolita'''s heart and soul".

Soundtrack
The film's soundtrack was composed by Ennio Morricone and released on the Music Box Records label. As the composer himself described the project: "With my music, I only had to follow on a high level the director's intentions to make Lolita a story of sincere and reciprocal love, even within the limits of the purity and malicious naiveté of its young subject."

See also

References

Works cited
 Gale, Steven H. Sharp Cut: Harold Pinter's Screenplays and the Artistic Process. Lexington, KY: The UP of Kentucky, 2003. . Print.
 Gale, Steven H. (ed.). The Films of Harold Pinter. Albany: SUNY P, 2001. . . Print.
 Hudgins, Christopher C. "Harold Pinter's Lolita: 'My Sin, My Soul'." 123–46 in Gale, The Films of Harold Pinter.
 Hudgins, Christopher C. "Three Unpublished Harold Pinter Filmscripts: The Handmaid's Tale, The Remains of the Day, Lolita. The Pinter Review: Nobel Prize / Europe Theatre Prize Volume: 2005–2008''. Ed. Francis Gillen with Steven H. Gale. Tampa: U of Tampa P, 2008. 132–39.  (hardcover).  (softcover). . Print.

External links
 
 
 Movie stills from Lolita

1997 films
1997 drama films
1997 independent films
1990s English-language films
1990s American films
1990s French films
1990s erotic drama films
1990s road movies
American drama road movies
American erotic drama films
American independent films
American neo-noir films
English-language French films
Films about child sexual abuse
Films about puberty
Films about educators
Films about murderers
Films based on American novels
Films based on works by Vladimir Nabokov
Films directed by Adrian Lyne
Films scored by Ennio Morricone
Films set in the 1920s
Films set in the 1930s
Films set in 1947
Films set in the 1950s
Films set in New Hampshire
Films shot in California
Films shot in El Paso, Texas
Films shot in France
Films shot in New Mexico
Films shot in New Orleans
Films shot in North Carolina
Films shot in San Antonio
Films shot in South Carolina
French drama road movies
French erotic drama films
French independent films
French neo-noir films
Incest in film
Juvenile sexuality in films
Pathé films